Hieracium pellucidum is a species of flowering plant belonging to the family Asteraceae.

Its native range is Northern Europe.

References

pellucidum